The Mad Lover, also known as A Modern Othello, is a 1917 American silent drama film directed by Léonce Perret and starring Robert Warwick, Elaine Hammerstein and Valentine Petit.

Cast
 Robert Warwick as Robert Hyde 
 Elaine Hammerstein as Clarice 
 Valentine Petit as Mrs. Grosvenor 
 Edward Kimball as The Pastor 
 Georges Flateau as Count Vinzaglio 
 Frank McGlynn Sr. as Lawyer Robertson

References

Bibliography
 Robert B. Connelly. The Silents: Silent Feature Films, 1910-36, Volume 40, Issue 2. December Press, 1998.

External links
 

1917 films
1917 drama films
1910s English-language films
American silent feature films
Silent American drama films
American black-and-white films
Films directed by Léonce Perret
Pathé Exchange films
1910s American films